Syed Faridoun (born 15 May 2001) is a Pakistani cricketer. He made his Twenty20 debut on 5 December 2021, for the Melbourne Stars in the 2021–22 Big Bash League season.

References

External links
 

2001 births
Living people
Pakistani cricketers
Melbourne Stars cricketers
Lahore Qalandars cricketers
Place of birth missing (living people)